Roussoellopsis is a genus of fungi in the class Dothideomycetes and order Pleosporales, and family Roussoellaceae. Roussoellaceae was introduced by Liu et al. (2014) and contains; Neoroussoella, Roussoella and Roussoellopsis.

The genus was named after Marietta Hannon Rousseau (1850–1926), who was a Belgian mycologist and taxonomist. 

The genus was circumscribed by Iwao Hino and Ken Katumoto in J. Jap. Bot. vol.40 on pages 85-86 in 1965.

Species
 Roussoellopsis japonica  
 Roussoellopsis macrospora 
 Roussoellopsis tosaensis

References

External links 
 Roussoellopsis at Index Fungorum

Dothideomycetes enigmatic taxa
Dothideomycetes genera